Knute Kenneth Rockne (March 4, 1888 – March 31, 1931) was a Norwegian-American player and coach of American football at the University of Notre Dame. Leading Notre Dame for 13 seasons, Rockne would accumulate over 100 wins and three national championships.

Rockne is regarded as one of the greatest coaches in college football history. His biography at the College Football Hall of Fame, where he was inducted in 1951, identifies him as "without question, American football's most-renowned coach". Rockne helped to popularize the forward pass and made the Notre Dame Fighting Irish a major factor in college football.

In 1931, at the age of 43, Rockne died in a plane crash.

Early life
Knute Rockne was born Knut Larsen Rokne, in Voss, Norway, to smith and wagonmaker Lars Knutson Rokne (1858–1912) and his wife, Martha Pedersdatter Gjermo (1859–1944). He emigrated to Chicago with his parents when he was five years old. He grew up in the Logan Square area of Chicago, on the northwest side of the city. Rockne learned to play football in his neighborhood and later played end in a local group called the Logan Square Tigers. He attended Lorenz Brentano elementary school, and North West Division High School in Chicago where he played football and ran track.

After Rockne graduated from high school, he took a job as a mail dispatcher with the post office in Chicago for four years. When he was 22, he had saved enough money to continue his education. He headed to Notre Dame in Indiana to finish his schooling. Rockne excelled as a football end there, winning All-American honors in 1913. Rockne worked as a lifeguard at Cedar Point in the summer of 1913.

Rockne helped to transform the college game in a single contest. On November 1, 1913, the Notre Dame squad stunned the highly regarded Army team 35–13 in a game played at West Point. Led by quarterback Charlie "Gus" Dorais and Rockne, the Notre Dame team attacked the Cadets with an offense that featured both the expected powerful running game but also long and accurate downfield forward passes from Dorais to Rockne. This game was not the "invention" of the forward pass, but it was the first major contest in which a team used the forward pass regularly throughout the game.

Professional career

At Notre Dame, Rockne was educated as a chemist and he graduated in 1914 with a degree in pharmacy. After graduating, he was the laboratory assistant to noted polymer chemist Julius Arthur Nieuwland at Notre Dame and helped out with the football team, but rejected further work in chemistry after receiving an offer to coach football. In 1914, he was recruited by Peggy Parratt to play for the Akron Indians. There Parratt had Rockne playing both end and halfback and teamed with him on several successful forward pass plays during their title drive. Knute wound up in Massillon, Ohio, in 1915 along with former Notre Dame teammate Dorais to play with the professional Massillon Tigers. Rockne and Dorais brought the forward pass to professional football from 1915 to 1917 when they led the Tigers to the championship in 1915. Pro Football in the Days of Rockne by Emil Klosinski maintains the worst loss ever suffered by Rockne was in 1917. He coached the "South Bend Jolly Fellows Club" when they lost 40–0 to the Toledo Maroons.

Notre Dame coach

While many trace Knute Rockne's debut as a Notre Dame football coach to the war-torn 1918 season, or in 1914 when he became an assistant coach under Jesse Harper, his first position was actually for the Corby and Sorin Hall football teams as a student-athlete in 1912 and 1913.  These teams represented residence halls on the university grounds that competed against one other in various sports, the most popular of which was football.  The term for these competitions is colloquially known as interhall sports.  Ironically, while Rockne holds the highest winning-percentage of any major college football coach, his overall record in the interhall football league was a paltry 2–5–4 across two seasons.

During 13 years as head coach, Rockne led Notre Dame to 105 victories, 12 losses, five ties and three consensus national championships, which included five undefeated and untied seasons.<ref>Portions of this section are adapted from Murray Sperber's book Shake Down The Thunder: The Creation of Notre Dame Football</ref> Rockne posted the highest all-time winning percentage (.881) for a major college football coach. His schemes utilized the eponymous Notre Dame Box offense and the 7–2–2 defense. Rockne's box included a shift. The backfield lined up in a T-formation, then quickly shifted into a box to the left or right just as the ball was snapped.

Rockne was also shrewd enough to recognize that intercollegiate sports had a show-business aspect. Thus he worked hard promoting Notre Dame football to make it financially successful. He used his considerable charm to court favor from the media, which then consisted of newspapers, wire services and radio stations and networks, to obtain free advertising for Notre Dame football. He was very successful as an advertising pitchman for South Bend-based Studebaker and other products. He eventually received an annual income of $75,000 from Notre Dame.

1918–1930

During the war-torn season of 1918, Rockne took over from his predecessor Jesse Harper and posted a 3–1–2 record, losing only to the Michigan Aggies. He made his coaching debut on September 28, 1918, against Case Tech in Cleveland, earning a 26–6 victory. In the backfield were Leonard Bahan, George Gipp, and Curly Lambeau. In Gipp, Rockne had an ideal handler of the forward pass.

Rockne handled the line and Gus Dorais handled the backfield of the 1919 team. The team went undefeated and was a national champion, though the championship is not recognized by Notre Dame.

Gipp died on December 14, 1920, just two weeks after being elected Notre Dame's first All-American by Walter Camp. He likely contracted strep throat and pneumonia while giving punting lessons after his final game, on November 20 against Northwestern University. Since antibiotics were not available in the 1920s, treatment options for such infections were limited and they could be fatal even to the young and healthy. It was while on his hospital bed and speaking to Rockne that he is purported to have delivered the line "win just one for the Gipper".

John Mohardt led the 1921 Notre Dame team to a 10–1 record with 781 rushing yards, 995 passing yards, 12 rushing touchdowns, and nine passing touchdowns. Grantland Rice wrote, "Mohardt could throw the ball to within a foot or two of any given space" and noted that the 1921 Notre Dame team "was the first team we know of to build its attack around a forward passing game, rather than use a forward passing game as a mere aid to the running game". Mohardt had both Eddie Anderson and Roger Kiley at end to receive his passes.

The national champion 1924 team included the "Four Horsemen" backfield of Harry Stuhldreher, Don Miller, Jim Crowley, and Elmer Layden. The line was known as the "Seven Mules". The Irish capped an undefeated 10–0 season with a victory over Stanford in the Rose Bowl.

For all his success, Rockne also made what an Associated Press writer called "one of the greatest coaching blunders in history". Instead of coaching his 1926 team against Carnegie Tech, Rockne traveled to Chicago for the Army–Navy Game to "write newspaper articles about it, as well as select an All-America football team". Carnegie Tech used the coach's absence as motivation for a 19–0 win; the upset likely cost the Irish a chance for a national title.

The 1928 team lost to national champion Georgia Tech. "I sat at Grant Field and saw a magnificent Notre Dame team suddenly recoil before the furious pounding of one man–Peter Pund", said Rockne. "Nobody could stop him. I counted 20 scoring plays that this man ruined." Rockne wrote of an attack on his coaching in the Atlanta Journal, "I am surprised that a paper of such fine, high standing [as yours] would allow a zipper to write in his particular vein ... the article by Fuzzy Woodruff was not called for."

On November 10, 1928, the Fighting Irish were tied with Army 0–0 at the end of the half. Rockne entered the locker room and told the team the words he heard on Gipp's deathbed in 1920: "I've got to go, Rock. It's all right. I'm not afraid. Some time, Rock, when the team is up against it, when things are going wrong and the breaks are beating the boys, tell them to go in there with all they've got and win just one for the Gipper. I don't know where I'll be then, Rock. But I'll know about it, and I'll be happy." This inspired the team, who then won the game 12–6. The phrase "Win one for the Gipper" was later used as a political slogan by Ronald Reagan, who in 1940 portrayed Gipp in Knute Rockne, All American.Both the 1929 and the 1930 teams went undefeated and were national champions. According to interviews, Rockne considered his 1929 team his strongest overall. Rockne also said he considered his 1930 team to have been his best offensively before the departure of Jumping Joe Savoldi. Rockne was struck with illness in 1929, and the de facto head coach was assistant Tom Lieb. Rockne's all-time All-America backfield was Jim Thorpe, Red Grange, George Gipp, and George Pfann.

Personal life

Rockne met Bonnie Gwendoline Skiles (1891–1956) of Kenton, Ohio, an avid gardener, while the two were employed at Cedar Point. Bonnie was the daughter of George Skiles and Huldah Dry. The two married at Sts. Peter and Paul Catholic Church in Sandusky, Ohio, on July 14, 1914, with Father William F. Murphy officiating and Gus Dorais as best man. They had four children: Knute Lars Jr., William Dorias, Mary Jeane and John Vincent. Rockne converted from the Lutheran to the Roman Catholic faith on November 20, 1925. The Rev. Vincent Mooney, C.S.C., baptized Rockne in the Log Chapel on Notre Dame's campus.

Plane crash and public reaction

Rockne died in the crash of a Transcontinental & Western Air airliner in Kansas on March 31, 1931, while en route to participate in the production of the film The Spirit of Notre Dame (released October 13, 1931). He had stopped in Kansas City to visit his two sons, Bill and Knute Jr., who were in boarding school there at the Pembroke-Country Day School. A little over an hour after taking off from Kansas City, one of the Fokker Trimotor's wings broke up in flight. The plane crashed into a wheat field near Bazaar, Kansas, killing Rockne and seven others.EAApilot magazine, August 2016

Coincidentally, Jess Harper was a friend of Rockne and also the coach whom Rockne had replaced at Notre Dame. A memorial dedicated to the victims stands on the spot where the plane crashed. The memorial is surrounded by a wire fence with wooden posts and was maintained for many years by James Heathman, who, at the age of 13 in 1931, was one of the first people to arrive at the site of the crash.

Rockne's unexpected death startled the nation and triggered a national outpouring of grief, comparable to the deaths of presidents. President Herbert Hoover called Rockne's death "a national loss".Hoover, Herbert, President of the United States, message to Mrs. Knute Rockne, 119 – "Message of Sympathy on the Death of Knute Rockne", April 1, 1931, Washington, D.C., cited on the web site of The American Presidency Project King Haakon VII of Norway posthumously knighted Rockne and sent a personal envoy, Olaf Bernts, Norwegian consul in Chicago, to Rockne's funeral.

Rockne was buried in Highland Cemetery in South Bend, the city adjacent to the Notre Dame campus.Six of his players from the previous year (Marty Brill, Tom Yarr, Frank Carideo, Marchy Schwartz, Tom Conley and Larry Mullins) carried him to his final resting place. More than 100,000 people lined the route of his funeral procession, and the funeral was broadcast live on network radio across the United States and in Europe as well as parts of South America and Asia.

Driven by the public feeling for Rockne, the crash story played out at length in nearly all the nation's newspapers and public demand for an inquiry into the crash's causes and circumstances ensued.Johnson, Randy, M.A. (Ph.D. candidate, Ohio Univ., Athens, OH; certified airline transport pilot & flight instructor), "The 'Rock': The Role of the Press in Bringing About Change in Aircraft Accident Policy.", Journal of Air Transportation World Wide, Vol. 5, No. 1, 2000, Aviation Institute, University of Nebraska at Omaha. The cause of the damage was determined to be that the plane's plywood outer skin was bonded to the ribs and spars with water-based aliphatic resin glue, and flight in rain had caused the bond to deteriorate to the point that sections of the plywood suddenly separated. The national outcry over the disaster triggered sweeping changes to aircraft design, manufacturing, operation, inspection, maintenance, regulation and crash investigation, igniting a safety revolution that ultimately transformed airline travel worldwide from one of the most dangerous forms of travel to one of the safest.

Legacy

Rockne was not the first coach to use the forward pass, but he helped popularize it nationally. Most football historians agree that a few schools, notably St. Louis University (under coach Eddie Cochems), Michigan, Carlisle and Minnesota, had passing attacks in place before Rockne arrived at Notre Dame. The great majority of passing attacks, however, consisted solely of short pitches and shovel passes to stationary receivers. Additionally, few of the major Eastern teams that constituted the power center of college football at the time used the pass.

In the summer of 1913, while he was a lifeguard on the beach at Cedar Point in Sandusky, Ohio, Rockne and his college teammate and roommate Gus Dorais worked on passing techniques. These were employed in games by the 1913 Notre Dame squad and subsequent Harper- and Rockne-coached teams and included many features common in modern passing, including having the passer throw the ball overhand and having the receiver run under a football and catch the ball in stride.

That fall, Notre Dame upset heavily favored Army 35–13 at West Point thanks to a barrage of Dorais-to-Rockne long downfield passes. The game played an important role in displaying the potency of the forward pass and "open offense" and convinced many coaches to add pass plays to their play books. The game is dramatized in the movies Knute Rockne, All American and The Long Gray Line. In May 1949, Knute Rockne appeared in the Master Man story on Kid Eternity comics, Vol 1, number 15.

Coaching tree
Rockne's coaching tree includes:

Eddie Anderson: played for Notre Dame (1919–1921), head coach for Iowa (1939–1949)
Hunk Anderson: played for Notre Dame (1918–1921), head coach for Notre Dame (1931–1933), NC State (1934–1936)
Joe Bach: played for Notre Dame (1923–1924), head coach for Duquesne (1934), Pittsburgh Pirates/Steelers (1935–1936; 1952–1953)
Charlie Bachman: played for Notre Dame (1914–1916), head coach for Kansas State (1920–1927), Florida (1928–1932), Michigan State (1933–1946)
Dutch Bergman: played for Notre Dame (1915–1916; 1919), head coach for Catholic (1930–1940), Washington Redskins (1943)
Frank Carideo: played for Notre Dame (1928–1930), head coach for Missouri (1932–1934)
Stan Cofall: played for Notre Dame (1914–1916), head coach for Wake Forest (1928).
Chuck Collins: played for Notre Dame (1922–1924), head coach for North Carolina (1926–1933).
Jim Crowley: played for Notre Dame (1922–1924), head coach for Michigan State (1928–1932), Fordham (1933–1941).
Gus Dorais: played for Notre Dame (1910–1913), assistant for Notre Dame (1919), head coach for Gonzaga (1920–1924).
Rex Enright: played for Notre Dame (1923–1925), head coach for South Carolina (1938–1942; 1946–1955).
Noble Kizer: played for Notre Dame (1922–1924), head coach for Purdue (1930–1936)
Elmer Layden: played for Notre Dame (1922–1924), head coach for Duquesne (1927–1933), Notre Dame (1934–1940)
Frank Leahy: played for Notre Dame (1928–1930), head coach for Boston College (1939–1940), Notre Dame (1941–1943; 1946–1953).
Tom Lieb: played for Notre Dame (1919–1922), head coach for Loyola Los Angeles (1930–1938), Florida (1940–1945).
Slip Madigan: played for Notre Dame (1916–1917; 1919), head coach for Saint Mary's (1921–1939) Iowa (1943–1944)
Harry Mehre: played for Notre Dame (1919–1921), head coach for Georgia (1928–1937), Ole Miss (1938–1945).
Don Miller: played for Notre Dame (1922–1924), assistant for Georgia Tech (1925–1928), Ohio State (1929–1932).
Edgar Miller: played for Notre Dame (1922–1924), head coach for Navy (1931–1933)
Chuck Riley: played for Notre Dame (1927), head coach for New Mexico (1931–1933)
Marchmont Schwartz: played for Notre Dame (1929–1931), head coach for Creighton (1935–1939), Stanford (1942–1950).
Buck Shaw: played for Notre Dame (1919–1921), head coach for NC State (1924), Nevada (1925–1928), San Francisco 49ers ( 1946–1954 ), Philadelphia Eagles ( 1958– 1960 ).
Maurice J. "Clipper" Smith: played for Notre Dame (1917–1920), head coach for Gonzaga (1925–1928), Villanova (1936–1942)
Harry Stuhldreher: played for Notre Dame (1922–1924), head coach for Villanova (1925–1935), Wisconsin (1936–1948).
Frank Thomas: played for Notre Dame (1920–1922), head coach for Alabama (1931–1946)
Adam Walsh: played for Notre Dame (1922–1924), head coach for Santa Clara (1925–1928), Bowdoin (1935–1942; 1947–1958)
Earl Walsh: played for Notre Dame (1919–1921), head coach for Fordham (1942).
John Weibel: played for Notre Dame (1923–1924), assistant for Vanderbilt (1925–1926), Duquesne (1927).
Chet A. Wynne: played for Notre Dame (1919–1921), head coach for Creighton (1923–1929), Auburn (1930–1933), Kentucky (1934–1937).
Larry Mullins: played for Notre Dame (1927-1930), head coach at St. Benedict's College (1932 to 1936), Loyola University of New Orleans (1937 to 1939), and St. Ambrose University (1940, 1947–1950).
Clem Crowe: played for Notre Dame (1923-1925), head coach for St. Vincent (1926-31), Xavier (1935-43), assistant for Notre Dame (1944), head coach for Iowa (1945), Buffalo Bills (1949), Baltimore Colts (1950), Ottawa Rough Riders* (1951-1954), BC Lions* (1956-1958)

Canadian Football League; Won Grey Cup in 1951

 Memorials 

 Notre Dame memorializes him in the Knute Rockne Memorial Building, an athletics facility built in 1937, as well as the main football stadium.
 His name appears on streets in South Bend and in Stevensville, Michigan, (where Rockne had a summer home), and a travel plaza on the Indiana Toll Road.
 The Rockne Memorial near Bazaar, Kansas at the site of the airliner crash memorializes Rockne and the seven others who died with him. It was erected by the late Easter Heathman, who as a boy was a crash eyewitness and was among the first to respond at the scene. Every five years since the crash, a memorial ceremony is held there and at a nearby schoolhouse, drawing relatives of the victims and Rockne and Notre Dame fans from around the world. Now part of the Heathman family estate, it is accessible only by arrangement or during memorial commemorations.
 The Matfield Green rest stop travel plaza (center foyer) on the Kansas Turnpike near Bazaar and the airliner crash site where Rockne was killed used to have a large, glassed-in exhibit commemorating Rockne (chiefly), the other crash victims, and the crash itself. The memorial was taken down during renovations of the travel plaza.
 In 1941, Allentown Central Catholic High School in Allentown, Pennsylvania dedicated its gymnasium, Rockne Hall, to Knute Rockne.
 Taylorville, Illinois dedicated the street next to the football field as "Knute Rockne Road".
 The town of Rockne, Texas was named to honor him. In 1931, the children of Sacred Heart School were given the opportunity to name their town. A vote was taken, with the children electing to name the town after Rockne, who had died in a plane crash earlier that year. On March 10, 1988, Rockne opened its post office for one day during which a Knute Rockne 22-cent commemorative stamp was issued. A life-size bust of Rockne was unveiled on March 4, 2006.
 The Studebaker automobile company of South Bend marketed the Rockne automobile from 1931 to 1933. It was a separate product line of Studebaker and priced in the low-cost market.
 Symphonic composer Ferde Grofe composed a musical suite in Rockne's honor shortly after the coach's death.
 In 1940, actor Pat O'Brien portrayed Rockne in the Warner Brothers film Knute Rockne, All American, in which Rockne used the phrase "win one for the Gipper" in reference to the death bed request of George Gipp, played by Ronald Reagan.
 The short film I Am an American (1944) featured Rockne as a foreign-born citizen
 Rockne was enshrined in the College Football Hall of Fame in 1951 as a charter member and in the Indiana Football Hall of Fame.
 In 1988, the United States Postal Service honored Rockne with a 22-cent commemorative postage stamp. President Ronald Reagan, who played George Gipp in the movie Knute Rockne, All American, gave an address at the Athletic & Convocation Center at the University of Notre Dame on March 9, 1988, and officially unveiled the Rockne stamp.
 In 1988, Rockne was inducted posthumously into the Scandinavian-American Hall of Fame held during Norsk Høstfest.
 A biographical musical of Rockne's life premiered at the Theatre at the Center in Munster, Indiana on April 3, 2008. The musical is based on a play and mini-series by Buddy Farmer.
 The U.S. Navy named a ship in the Liberty ship class after Knute Rockne in 1943. The SS Knute Rockne was scrapped in 1972.
 A statue of Rockne, as well as Ara Parseghian, both by the sculptor Armando Hinojosa of Laredo, Texas, are located on the Notre Dame campus.
 He was inducted into the Rose Bowl Hall of Fame as a member of the Class of 2014.

Head coaching record

See also
 List of teachers portrayed in films

References

Further reading
 Brondfield, Jerry. Rockne: The Coach, the Man, the Legend (1976, reissued 2009)
 Carter, Bob, Sports Century Biography:"Knute Rockne was Notre Dame's master motivator,", Special to ESPN.com
 Cavanaugh, Jack. The Gipper: George Gipp, Knute Rockne, and the Dramatic Rise of Notre Dame Football (2010)
 Harmon, Daniel E. Notre Dame Football (The Rosen Publishing Group, 2013).
 Lindquist, Sherry C. M. Memorializing Knute Rockne at the University of Notre Dame: Collegiate Gothic Architecture and Institutional Identity", Winterthur Portfolio (Spring 2012), 46#1 pp 1–24. . .
 Lovelace, Delos Wheeler. Rockne of Notre Dame (1931)
 Norsk Biografisk leksikon  (NBL)
 Robinson, Ray. Rockne of Notre Dame: The Making of a Football Legend (1999)
 Rockne, Knute K. Coaching. (Devin-Adair, 1925).
 Sperber, Murray, Shake Down the Thunder: The Creation of Notre Dame Football (1993)
 Stewart, Mark. The Notre Dame Fighting Irish (Norwood House Press, 2011)
 Stuhldreher, Harry. Knute Rockne, Man Builder (Grosset & Dunlap, 1931)

External links

 
 
 Knute Rockne letters to Eugene Roberts, MSS 7691 at L. Tom Perry Special Collections, Harold B. Lee Library, Brigham Young University

1888 births
1931 deaths
Accidental deaths in Kansas
Akron Indians (Ohio League) players
American football ends
Coaches of American football from Illinois
College Football Hall of Fame inductees
Converts to Roman Catholicism from Lutheranism
Dispatchers
Fort Wayne Friars players
Massillon Tigers players
Norwegian emigrants to the United States
Norwegian players of American football
Notre Dame Fighting Irish athletic directors
Notre Dame Fighting Irish football coaches
Notre Dame Fighting Irish football players
Sportspeople from Chicago
Sportspeople from Sandusky, Ohio
People from Voss
Players of American football from Chicago
University of Notre Dame faculty
Victims of aviation accidents or incidents in the United States
Victims of aviation accidents or incidents in 1931
Catholics from Ohio